The 2001–02 season is JS Kabylie's 37th season in the Algerian top flight, They will be competing in National 1, the Algerian Cup and the CAF Cup.

Squad list
Players and squad numbers last updated on 1 September 2001.Note: Flags indicate national team as has been defined under FIFA eligibility rules. Players may hold more than one non-FIFA nationality.

Competitions

Overview

{| class="wikitable" style="text-align: center"
|-
!rowspan=2|Competition
!colspan=8|Record
!rowspan=2|Started round
!rowspan=2|Final position / round
!rowspan=2|First match	
!rowspan=2|Last match
|-
!
!
!
!
!
!
!
!
|-
| National

|  
| style="background:silver;"|Runners-up
| 30 August 2001
| 1 July 2002
|-
| Algerian Cup

| Round of 64
| Semi-finals
| 14 March 2002
| 10 June 2002
|-
| 2001 CAF Cup

| Quarter-finals
| style="background:gold;"|Finals
| 8 September 2001
| 23 November 2001
|-
| 2002 CAF Cup

| colspan=2|Second round
| 13 April 2002
| 28 April 2002
|-
! Total

National

League table

Results summary

Results by round

Matches

Algerian Cup

2001 CAF Cup

Quarter-finals

Semi-finals

Final

2002 CAF Cup

Second round

Squad information

Playing statistics

|-

|-
! colspan=12 style=background:#dcdcdc; text-align:center| Players transferred out during the season

Goalscorers
Includes all competitive matches. The list is sorted alphabetically by surname when total goals are equal.

Transfers

In

Out

Notes

References

JS Kabylie seasons
JS Kabylie